Verin Geghavank is an abandoned village in the Kajaran Municipality of the Syunik Province of Armenia.

Demographics 
Statistical Committee of Armenia reported it was uninhabited at the 2001 and 2011 censuses.

References 

Former populated places in Syunik Province